Seasons of the Heart is a 1994 American made-for-television drama film directed by actress and filmmaker Lee Grant, starring Carol Burnett and George Segal, alongside Eric Lloyd and Malcolm McDowell in supporting roles. Marvin Hamlisch composed the film's score. It was first broadcast on NBC on May 24, 1994.

Plot
Vivian, a newly married book publisher, has her life turned upside down when she and her husband Ezra are unexpectedly tasked with raising her young grandson.

Cast
Carol Burnett... Vivian Levinson
George Segal... Ezra Goldstine
Eric Lloyd... David
Jill Teed... Ellen
Malcolm McDowell... Alfred McGuinness

Reception
Variety praised the film for its "stellar performances" and claimed that it was "better than most of the movies of its genre." Its initial broadcast received 17.2 million viewers and was the 21st highest viewed broadcast of its week in the Nielsen ratings. Eric Lloyd was nominated for a Young Artist Award for his performance.

References

External links

1994 television films
1994 drama films
1994 films
Films shot in Vancouver
Films directed by Lee Grant
Films scored by Marvin Hamlisch
NBC network original films
Sonar Entertainment films
American drama television films
1990s American films